Marcus Raymond Price (born March 3, 1972) is a former American football offensive tackle in the National Football League for the Jacksonville Jaguars, San Diego Chargers, New Orleans Saints, Buffalo Bills and Dallas Cowboys. He played college football at Louisiana State University.

Early years
Price attended Lincoln High School, where he began to play football as a junior. He was a two-way tackle and a two-time All-district selection. He also competed in the discus throw.

He accepted a football scholarship from Louisiana State University. As a redshirt freshman, he appeared in 8 games as a backup. As a sophomore, he was a backup at left tackle for 10 games and at left guard for one game.

As a junior, he became a starter at right tackle as a junior. As a senior, he was the starter at right tackle, contributing to the offense averaging 220.3 passing yards per game.

Professional career

Jacksonville Jaguars
Price was selected by the Jacksonville Jaguars in the sixth round (172nd overall) of the 1995 NFL Draft. He was a part of the franchise's inaugural season. He suffered torn ligaments in his left ankle in the third preseason game against the Miami Dolphins. He was placed on the injured reserve list on August 19. 

He was waived on August 25, 1996. On February 3, 1997, he was re-signed by the Jaguars. He was released on August 19.

San Diego Chargers
On November 25, 1997, he was signed by the San Diego Chargers to the practice squad. He was promoted to the active roster and saw action in the last 2 games at offensive tackle.

In 1998, he appeared in 10 games as a backup and on special teams. He was cut on September 21, 1999.

New Orleans Saints
On March 23, 2000, he was signed as a free agent by the New Orleans Saints. He was cut on December 4. He was re-signed on December 7, finishing the season after playing in 7 games and being declared inactive in 8 contests. 

In 2001, he appeared in 12 games. He was not re-signed after the season.

Buffalo Bills
On March 12, 2002, he was signed as a free agent by the Buffalo Bills, to a $1.875 million three-year contract that included a $150,000 signing bonus. He played in 3 seasons as a reserve swing tackle. He wasn't re-signed after the 2004 season.

Dallas Cowboys
On November 27, 2005, he was signed by the Dallas Cowboys as a free agent, to provide depth after the season-ending injury to Pro Bowl player Flozell Adams. He was declared inactive in 4 games and was not re-signed after the season.

Coaching career
After retiring, Price coached football at Westview High School in San Diego, California. He is now a teacher at Rushing Middle School in Prosper, Texas.

References

1972 births
Living people
American football offensive guards
American football offensive tackles
Buffalo Bills players
Dallas Cowboys players
Jacksonville Jaguars players
LSU Tigers football players
New Orleans Saints players
San Diego Chargers players
High school football coaches in California
Sportspeople from Port Arthur, Texas
Players of American football from Texas